The NFL on TNT was the name for the series of National Football League (NFL) broadcasts produced by Turner Sports for Turner Network Television (TNT). 

TNT aired NFL games on Sunday nights from 1990 until 1997 and served as one of the league’s two cable television partners during that time with ESPN.

History

Sunday night games (1990–1997)
TNT’s contract with the NFL coincided with the expansion of the league’s Sunday night scheduling to encompass the entire season, as opposed to the occasional matchups the league scheduled beginning in 1987. The contract in force at the time split the Sunday night telecasts between TNT and ESPN, who had originally had the rights to the Sunday night slate of games when they were limited to late season matchups. TNT carried Sunday night games for the first half of the NFL season, with ESPN taking over afterwards. TNT would also air any Thursday night NFL matchups that were scheduled during the first half of the season, with ESPN taking any in the second half. 

As has always been the case for cable NFL broadcasts, TNT did not have exclusive rights to the broadcasts. As such, any game airing on TNT was simulcast on regular over-the-air television stations in each participating team's local market so that households without cable television could still see the telecasts.

ESPN anchor Chris Berman referred to TNT's football programming by its original "Nitro" brand, even after TNT abandoned that moniker. (This is not to be confused with the professional wrestling show called WCW Monday Nitro.)

It does not appear that TNT's coverage ever used the title Sunday Night Football, and indeed ESPN filed for a trademark on that title in 1996 (the trademark was later assigned to the NFL, allowing for its eventual use by NBC).

The last game was aired on October 26, 1997. Fittingly, one of the teams involved was the Atlanta Falcons, based in the home city of Turner Broadcasting - Atlanta, Georgia (they played at their division rivals, the Carolina Panthers, located up Interstate 85 in Charlotte, North Carolina). Unlike the Braves, Hawks and Thrashers, however, Turner never owned the Falcons at any point in time (due to NFL ownership rules).

Schedules

Studio shows
The network had a one-hour studio pregame show, titled The Stadium Show, from 1990 to 1994. In 1995, this was reduced to a half-hour and retitled Pro Football Tonight, running through 1997. Fred Hickman was one of the studio hosts during this time, and Mark May (now of ESPN) was one of the studio analysts before moving to the booth for the final season.

Fantasy Football legacy
The Sunday night TNT halftime show was the first major network NFL broadcast to utilize a player statistics "crawl" at the bottom of the screen.  With Fantasy Football in its early stages of popularity, and the internet not being readily available to the general public, this was the only way for most fans to get updated Sunday player stats without waiting until the 11:00 PM or midnight sports highlight shows on CNN and ESPN.  However, in the second half of the NFL season when ESPN would broadcast Sunday night games, Fantasy Football fans would be disappointed since ESPN did not provide the same detailed crawl during their halftime show.

Super Bowl Television
In addition to the Sunday night games, TNT also presented an annual special, Super Bowl Television. The program, which aired on Friday and Saturday night, mixed a preview of that season's game with entertainment segments. Ernie Johnson hosted the show from the Super Bowl host city.

The end of TNT's coverage
TNT lost their rights to the NFL following the 1997 season after ESPN chose to bid on the entire regular season package beginning in 1998. In the wake of the loss of NFL rights, TNT began negotiations with NBC Sports to start a new football league; TNT eventually backed out of the proposal. (NBC's proposed league eventually became the XFL.) TNT would not air professional football again until signing on as a broadcast partner with the Alliance of American Football in 2019.

Personalities

In the booth

Play-by-play
Skip Caray (1990–1991)
Gary Bender (1992–1994)
Verne Lundquist (1995–1997)

Color commentary
Pat Haden (1990–1997)
Mark May (1997)

Sideline reporters
Craig Sager (1990–1997)
Bryan Burwell (1997)

Studio

Hosts
Fred Hickman (1990–1992)
Bob Neal (1993–1994)
Vince Cellini (1995–1997)

Analysts
Larry King (1990)
Kevin Kiley (1990–1994)
Lawrence Taylor (1994)
Mark May (1995–1996)
Warren Moon (1995)
Randall Cunningham (1996)
Keith Jackson (1997)
Sean Jones (1997)

References

External links
 1997 NFL on TNT Schedule
 CNN/SI story regarding B.Smith fainting incident (bottom of page)

1990 American television series debuts
Sunday Night Football
Night Football
1997 American television series endings
Turner Sports